There are four castles in Tyne and Wear, a metropolitan county in North East England. One is a gatehouse, one is a keep, one is an enclosure and one is an artillery fort.

All four of Tyne and Wear's castles are scheduled monuments. A scheduled monument is a "nationally important" archaeological site or historic building, given protection against unauthorised change.

The purpose of a castle was not simply militaristic, but was also considered to be a stamp of authority over the population of an area and a status symbol. Some would have acted as centres of trade and administration for a manor. The earliest castle in Tyne and Wear is Tynemouth Castle.

List of castles

References

Bibliography

 
History of Tyne and Wear
Military history of Tyne and Wear
Buildings and structures in Tyne and Wear
Archaeological sites in Tyne and Wear